Mizo Hmeichhe Insuihkhawm Pawl (meaning "binding women together" in the Mizo language) or MHIP was formed in the union territory of Mizoram, India, on 6 July 1974. It aims to empower women and support women's rights.
Following the 2009 decision of the Delhi High Court to legalize same-sex relationships, MHIP joined an anti-LGBT alliance with Mizoram Upa Pawl (MUP), the Young Mizo Association (YMA) and the Mizo Zirlai Pawl (MZP).

In 2013, MHIP was behind several bills proposed in the Mizoram Legislative Assembly, such as the Mizo Marriage Bill, the Mizo Inheritance Bill, and the Mizo Divorce Bill. The 2014 Mizo Marriage Divorce and Inheritance of Property Act abolished the customary practice in which a wife was left with nothing after a divorce and established that a wife could end up with up to 50 per cent of any property. During the 2018 assembly elections, MHIP repeated its calls for more women to stand as candidates. MHIP was led by B. Sangkhumi and then by Lalthlamuani.

Recognition and awards
In Mizoram, 6 July is marked as MHIP Day and is a national bank holiday. The group was awarded the 2016 Nari Shakti Puraskar.

References

1974 establishments in India
Nari Shakti Puraskar winners
Anti-LGBT sentiment
Women's rights in India
Mizoram